The Cooperation Band (stylised as the cooperation band) is a British brass band based in Glasgow. It has won the Scottish brass band championship a record 36 times, and the National Brass Band Championships of Great Britain twice.

History 

The band was formed in 1918 as the Scottish Co-operative Wholesale Society (SCWS) band, originally drawing its players from the SCWS factories in Glasgow. It continued to receive sponsorship from the Co-operative Group, adopting a number of names relating to the group's business, most recently the Co-operative Funeralcare Band from 2009 until 2019

As CWS (Glasgow) band, they won the National Brass Band Championships of Great Britain in 1990, and repeated this feat in 1996.

In 2018, it was announced that the Co-operative Group would withdraw its sponsorship, and the band's future seemed in doubt. However, a new sponsorship deal was arranged with Scotmid cooperative society, which brought with it a new name of "the cooperation band".

References 

British instrumental musical groups
Musical groups from Glasgow
Musical groups established in 1918
British brass bands